Basen Górniczy is a part of the Szczecin City, Poland, situated on the islands between the West Oder river and East Oder River (Regalica), south-east of the Szczecin Old Town, and west of Szczecin-Dąbie.

Neighbourhoods of Szczecin